This is a list of all the United States Supreme Court cases from volume 371 of the United States Reports:

External links

1962 in United States case law
1963 in United States case law